Hélder Malta Macedo (Krugersdorp, November 1935) is a Portuguese writer.

His father was a colonial administrator in Zambézia, Mozambique, where Macedo grew up till the age of 12. His opposition to the Salazar regime caused him to seek exile in London during the 1950s.

References

1935 births
Living people
Portuguese poets
Portuguese novelists
Fellows of King's College London